Mambolo is a chiefdom in Kambia District of Sierra Leone with a population of 33,825. Its principal town is Mambolo.

References

Chiefdoms of Sierra Leone
Northern Province, Sierra Leone